Mile located in the Visoko basin was a medieval crowning and burial place of Bosnian kings during the Kingdom of Bosnia (1377–1463). Mile is a protected national monument of Bosnia and Herzegovina.

History 

Mile held a great importance for Bosnian nobility, and was one of the places for Stanak, the most common name used to refer to the assembly of nobility in medieval Bosnia. From 1367 to 1407 several historical sources mention Ragusan merchants who gave money contributions for the Franciscan friary that was located in Mile, which is, according to sources from 1380 to 1390, identified as Stephen II Kotromanić ban's foundation, the Franciscan friary of Saint Nicholas of the Little Brothers.

Mile was first mentioned (in written sources: Mile, Sv. Nikola, Visoko, Mileševo) in 1244, as a place of church of Saint Kuzma and Damjan. The same year, Stephen II Kotromanić built the first Franciscan friary of Saint Nicholas. Mile was the crowning place of Bosnian kings, and possible place of crowning the first Bosnian king Tvrtko I Kotromanić in 1377.

The grave of Stephen II, who died in 1353, couldn't be identified in later archaeological excavations. Mavro Orbini and later authors cite that Stephen II built a church in Mile, and by his own will wanted to be buried there. Tvrtko I, King of Bosnia's grave has been located and identified in the north wall of the church.

See also 
Milodraž
 Visoko during the Middle Ages
 Old town of Visoki
 Visoko
 Podvisoki

References

Sources 
 
 Lovrenović, Dubravko, “Proglašenje Bosne kraljevinom 1377”, Forum Bosnae, 3-4, Sarajevo, 1999

External links 

 Tourism agency of  Zenica-Doboj canton

History of Visoko
National Monuments of Bosnia and Herzegovina
Kingdom of Bosnia
Burial sites of Kotromanić dynasty
Bosnia and Herzegovina culture
Archaeological sites in Bosnia and Herzegovina
Burial sites of Bosnian noble families